Patricia L. Birkholz (January 28, 1944 - May 3, 2018) was a director of the Michigan Office of the Great Lakes.  Previously, she served as a member of the Michigan State Senate from 2002 to 2010. In the Senate, she represented the 24th district comprising Allegan, Barry and Eaton Counties.  Prior to her terms in the Senate, she represented the 88th District in the Michigan House of Representatives from 1996 to 2002. She was the Allegan County Treasurer from 1992 to 1996. Birkholz began her career in politics as a trustee for Saugatuck Township.

Birkholz has a degree from Western Michigan University.

Birholz died of cancer on May 3, 2018, aged 74.

References

External links
Vote Smart bio

1944 births
2018 deaths
Western Michigan University alumni
Michigan state senators
Members of the Michigan House of Representatives
Women state legislators in Michigan
People from Allegan, Michigan
20th-century American politicians
20th-century American women politicians
21st-century American politicians
21st-century American women politicians